Kilsund is a village in Arendal municipality in Agder county, Norway. The village is located on the island of Tverrdalsøya, although the village has grown over the bridge onto the nearby island of Flostaøya a short distance to the south. Kilsund has two small villages located just to the north and east: Staubø and Holmsund.

References

Villages in Agder
Arendal